Durdat-Larequille is a commune in the Allier department in central France.

The commune was the birthplace of Christophe Thivrier, a miner who became the first Socialist mayor in France and then was a Deputy in the National Assembly.

Population

See also
Communes of the Allier department

References

Communes of Allier
Allier communes articles needing translation from French Wikipedia